Leucosia may refer to any of the following:
Leucosia (genus), a genus of crabs
Leucosia, a possible name for one of the sirens of Greek mythology
Leucosia, a former name for Nicosia, Cyprus
Kira Underwood, a deceased character in Ready Player One whose persona is Leucosia.